Nik Akif Syahiran bin Nik Mat (born 11 May 1999) is a Malaysian professional footballer who plays as a midfielder for Malaysia Super League club Penang, and the Malaysia national team.

Born in Kuala Krai in state of Kelantan, Nik Akif started his career at Bukit Jalil Sports School before joined Kelantan youth team in 2017.

Club career

Kelantan
On 11 November 2017, it was announced that Nik Akif has been promoted to the Kelantan's first team for 2018 season. On 3 February 2018, Nik Akif made his first league appearance for Kelantan in a 1–2 defeat over Melaka United coming off bench for Fadhilah Pauzi.

Terengganu
On 8 December 2020, Nik Akif officially sign 2 years contract with Terengganu FC.

International career

Youth
On 2 September 2017, Akif has been selected to represent Malaysia U19 at 2017 AFF U-18 Youth Championship in Yangon, Myanmar. On 4 September 2017, Nik Akif made his debut for Malaysia U19 in a 4–1 win over Laos. Nik Akif has scored one goal in a 1–1 draw over Thailand on 12 September 2017. On the final of Hassanah Bolkiah Trophy, Akif scored the winning goal for Malaysia defeating Myanmar 3-4.

On 31 October 2017, Akif Syahiran scored one goal in 1–4 win over Timor-Leste during the 2018 AFC U-19 Championship qualification at Paju Public Stadium.

On 23 November 2017, Akif Syahiran has been enlisted in Malaysia U22's 30-man provisional squad for the 2018 AFC U-23 Championship. On 10 January 2018, Akif made his first appearance for the Malaysia U23 came from the bench in the 88th minute in a 1–4 defeat to Iraq at Changshu Stadium.

Career statistics

Club

International

Malaysia Under-19

Honours
Malaysia U19
 AFF U-19 Youth Championship: 2018

References

External links

Living people
1999 births
People from Kelantan
Malaysian people of Malay descent
Malaysian footballers
Kelantan FA players
Terengganu FC players
Kelantan United F.C. players
Penang F.C. players
Association football midfielders
Malaysia Super League players
Footballers at the 2018 Asian Games
Asian Games competitors for Malaysia
Competitors at the 2019 Southeast Asian Games
Malaysia international footballers
Malaysia youth international footballers
Competitors at the 2021 Southeast Asian Games
Southeast Asian Games competitors for Malaysia